The 1908 Canadian federal election was held on Monday October 26, 1908 to elect members  of the House of Commons of Canada of the 11th Parliament of Canada. Prime Minister Sir Wilfrid Laurier's Liberal Party of Canada was re-elected for a fourth consecutive term in government with a majority government. The Liberals lost four seats and a small share of the popular vote.

Sir Robert Borden's Conservatives and Liberal-Conservatives won ten additional seats.

This was the first election in which Alberta and Saskatchewan voted as provinces. Following their creation in 1905, the two new provinces continued to be represented by MP's initially elected under the old Northwest Territories riding boundaries, some of which straddled the new provincial border. The remainder of the Northwest Territories that previously had Parliamentary representation lost it, although parts of the NWT would gain or re-gain representation after being added to Manitoba, Ontario and Quebec in 1912. A seat would not be created for the NWT itself again (which then contained the modern NWT and Nunavut) until 1949.

National results

Results by province

See also
 
List of Canadian federal general elections
List of political parties in Canada
11th Canadian Parliament

Notes

References

Further reading
 

 
1908 elections in Canada
1908
October 1908 events